At the 1976 Summer Olympics in Montreal, 20 wrestling events were contested, all for men only. There were 10 weight classes in each of the freestyle wrestling and Greco-Roman wrestling disciplines.

Medal summary

Freestyle

Greco-Roman

Medal table

Participating nations
A total of 330 wrestlers from 41 nations competed at the Montreal Games:

See also
List of World and Olympic Champions in men's freestyle wrestling
List of World and Olympic Champions in Greco-Roman wrestling

References

Sources
 

 
1976 Summer Olympics events
Olympics
1976